Emerald is  a modern feminine given name of English origin given in reference to the gemstone.

Popularity
It has seen regular use in the United States and other English-speaking countries. It ranked among the top 1,000 names given to newborn girls in the United States between 1991 and 2002, peaking at No. 765 during that period. The popularity of other gemstone names for girls such as Ruby and of names with an Em- sound such as Emily and Emma might have influenced the increased use of the name for girls. It was the 913th most popular name in 2021 for girls in the United States, with 291 girls given the name that year.

People with the name
Emerald Fennell (born 1985), British actress, filmmaker, and writer

Notes

English feminine given names
Given names derived from gemstones